The 2018 Northwestern Wildcats football team represented Northwestern University during the 2018 NCAA Division I FBS football season. The Wildcats played their home games at Ryan Field in Evanston, Illinois and competed in the West Division of the Big Ten Conference. They were led by 13th-year head coach Pat Fitzgerald.

Northwestern began the year with a 1–3 record after winning its conference road opener against Purdue but falling to non-conference foes Duke and Akron, as well as Michigan in their conference home opener. The team won their next four games, including wins over ranked opponents Michigan State and Wisconsin, before falling to Notre Dame, which secured a winless non-conference slate. Regardless, the Wildcats clinched their first Big Ten West Division title by defeating No. 21 Iowa the following week. They won their remaining two conference games to finish the regular season with a conference record of 8–1. In the 2018 Big Ten Football Championship Game, they lost to East Division champion Ohio State 45–24. The team was invited to the Holiday Bowl to play Pac-12 Conference runner-up Utah. The Wildcats won by a score of 31–20, their third consecutive bowl victory, which was a program first. In the final AP Poll of the season, the Wildcats were ranked 21st.

Quarterback Clayton Thorson led the team's offense, finishing with 3,183 passing yards, third most in the Big Ten Conference, to go along with 17 passing touchdowns and nine rushing touchdowns. Thorson, a fourth-year starter, finished his career as the school's all-time leading passer. Freshman running back Isaiah Bowser led the team in rushing with 866 yards, and wide receiver Flynn Nagel led the team in receiving with 780 yards. On defense, linebacker Blake Gallagher led the Big Ten in total tackles with 127. Fellow linebacker Paddy Fisher was named first team all-conference by the coaches, while defensive back Montre Hartage was named to the first team by the media. Head coach Pat Fitzgerald received the conference's coach of the year award.

Previous season
The Wildcats finished the 2017 season 10–3, 7–2 in Big Ten play to finish in second place in the West Division. They received an invitation to the Music City Bowl where they defeated Kentucky 24–23.

Preseason

Award watch lists

Schedule

Game summaries

at Purdue

Duke

Akron

Michigan

at Michigan State

Nebraska

at Rutgers

Wisconsin

Notre Dame

at Iowa

at Minnesota

Illinois

vs. Ohio State (Big Ten Championship Game)

vs. Utah (Holiday Bowl)

Rankings

Roster

Awards and honors

Players drafted into the NFL

References

Northwestern
Northwestern Wildcats football seasons
Holiday Bowl champion seasons
Northwestern Wildcats football